Ventura AirConnect is an Indian nonscheduled airline operating flights in the state of Gujarat with Cessna 208 Caravan aircraft in its fleet. Initially operating flights within Madhya Pradesh, the airline shifted to Gujarat upon being acquired by a group of Gujarati diamond merchants in 2014. The airline underwent a change in ownership and had to suspend operations in 2015. After winning a contract from the Government of Gujarat to start flights in the state, Ventura AirConnect resumed operations in June 2016 and made Surat International Airport its operating hub.

History

Madhya Pradesh operations (2010–13)
Ventura AirConnect was founded in 2010 as the first intrastate non-scheduled airline in India, providing air charter services within Madhya Pradesh. The airline was designed to connect the capital Bhopal with smaller cities throughout the state, as well as to facilitate tourism within Madhya Pradesh. Under an agreement signed between the state government and the airline, the state government partly subsidized Ventura AirConnect's flights.

Ventura AirConnect conducted its inaugural flight on 7 September 2011, between Bhopal and Gwalior. The inauguration ceremony was attended by Chief Minister Shivraj Singh Chouhan. By mid-2013, Ventura AirConnect was serving nine cities in the state. In early 2017 the Madhya Pradesh operations were taken up by Fly Divine.

Gujarat operations (2014–present)
Diamond Aeronautics had complained of limited air service from Surat, a major centre of the local diamond industry. With the purchase, the focus of Ventura AirConnect turned to improve air connectivity within Gujarat. The new venture commenced operations on 13 December 2014 with a flight from Surat to Bhavnagar.

The airline suspended operations in late 2015. There was a change in ownership, requiring security clearance from the Directorate General of Civil Aviation (DGCA). In April 2016, Ventura AirConnect won a tender from the Government of Gujarat to operate subsidised flights within the state. The airline's air operator's certificate was renewed on 9 June and it resumed operations on 25 June with a flight from Surat to Bhavnagar.

Destinations
As of September 2017, Ventura AirConnect flies to the following destinations, all within the Indian state of Gujarat:

Fleet 

References

External links 
 

Airlines established in 2010
Airlines of India
Transport in Gujarat
Indian companies established in 2010
2010 establishments in Gujarat